Anindita Bose is an Indian actress in Bengali-language film and television. She started her acting career in television and then moved to the big screen. In 2012 she acted in the film Bhooter Baari.

Career 
Bose started her acting career in television and acted in serials like Gaaner Oparey and she was also seen in Bou Kotha Kou. Bose made her big screen debut with the 2010 Bengali film Clerk. In 2012, she acted in the commercially successful film Bhooter Bhabishyat.

Filmography

Television

Short films

Web series

References

External links 
 

Living people
Actresses in Bengali cinema
Bengali television actresses
21st-century Indian actresses
Indian film actresses
Indian television actresses
Year of birth missing (living people)